The copula linguae  or copula, is a swelling that forms from the second pharyngeal arch, late in the fourth week of embryogenesis. During the fifth and sixth weeks the copula becomes overgrown and covered by the hypopharyngeal eminence which forms mostly from the third pharyngeal arch and in part from the fourth pharyngeal arch.

References

External links
 

Anatomy